Igor Poznič (born 13 August 1967) is a former Slovenian football player who played as a forward. In 1993, he made one appearance for the Slovenia national football team. During most of his playing career Poznič played for Maribor where he has made 256 appearances and scored 88 goals, making him one of the most successful players in the club's history. Poznič was also one of the most prolific scorers in the Slovenian PrvaLiga, during the early 1990s, with a 50% scoring rate (51 goals in 102 league appearances).

See also
List of NK Maribor players

References

1967 births
Living people
Yugoslav footballers
Slovenian footballers
Slovenia international footballers
Association football forwards
NK Maribor players
Grazer AK players
NK Mura players
F.C. Felgueiras players
NK Drava Ptuj players
Slovenian PrvaLiga players
2. Liga (Austria) players
Slovenian Second League players
Slovenian expatriate footballers
Slovenian expatriate sportspeople in Austria
Expatriate footballers in Austria
Slovenian expatriate sportspeople in Portugal
Expatriate footballers in Portugal